UOL may refer to:
United Online, a subsidiary of B. Riley Financial
University of Lahore, established in 1999 as a private university in Pakistan
University of Leeds, a British Redbrick university located in the city of Leeds, West Yorkshire, England
University of London, a federal university made up of 31 affiliates: 19 separate university institutions, and 12 research institutes
University of Liverpool, a teaching and research university in the city of Liverpool, England
University of Leicester, a research-led university based in Leicester, England
University of Lincoln, a university located in Lincoln, England
Universo Online, a Brazilian online service provider, now branded simply as UOL
 Unicorns of Love, a German League of Legends esports team
UOL, IATA code for Pogogul Airport

See also 
KCL UOL, acronym for King's College, London
UOL HOST, a website hosting and cloud computing firm owned by Universo Online
UOLDIVEO, an IT outsourcing company owned by Universo Online
U of L (disambiguation)